The men's K-1 1000 metres event was an individual kayaking event conducted as part of the Canoeing at the 1968 Summer Olympics program. Heats and the first repechage were timed in tenths of a second (0.1) while semifinals and finals were timed in hundredths of a second (0.01) in the official report.

Medalists

Results

Heats
The 20 competitors first raced in three heats on October 22. The top three finishers from each of the heats advanced directly to the semifinals. One competitor capsized during their heat while another did not start. All remaining competitors competed in the repechages the next day.

Inchusate's boat capsized during the first heat. In the third heat, Viitamäki is shown as Ilkka Nummisto in the official report though Viitamäki's name is shown correctly for the rest of the event.

Repechages
Taking place on October 23, three repechages were held. The top three finishers in each repechages advanced to the semifinals.

Semifinals
The top three finishers in each of the three semifinals (raced on October 24) advanced to the final.

Final
The final took place on October 25.

Hesz was fifth at the 500 meter mark, then made his move with 200 meters left. He passed both Hansen and Shaparenko in the last 100 meters.

References
1968 Summer Olympics official report Volume 3, Part 2. pp. 615–6. 
Sports-reference.com 1968 K-1 1000 m results.
Wallechinsky, David and Jaime Loucky (2008). "Canoeing: Men's Kayak Singles 1000 Meters". In The Complete Book of the Olympics: 2008 Edition. London: Aurum Press limited. p. 472.

Men's K-1 1000
Men's events at the 1968 Summer Olympics